Dennis Raven (born 26 November 1967) is a Dutch judoka. He competed in the men's heavyweight event at the 1992 Summer Olympics.

References

External links
 

1967 births
Living people
Dutch male judoka
Olympic judoka of the Netherlands
Judoka at the 1992 Summer Olympics
Sportspeople from Zaanstad
20th-century Dutch people